Mythimna hannemanni is a moth in the family Noctuidae. It is found in Taiwan.

The length of the forewings is 15.3-16.2 mm. The forewings are brownish yellow, tinged with rufous. The hindwings are fuscous on the outer half and the basal area is slightly whitish.

References

Moths described in 1991
Mythimna (moth)
Moths of Taiwan